Lasha Jakobia (born 20 August 1980 in Tbilisi) is a Georgian retired football player.

Football career

Belgium
Lasha Jakobia started his career at Belgian League club Standard Liège. He then spent his career at lower division for Visé, FC Liège, before joined Eendracht Aalst. He then suffered long-period of injuries, and signed a contract until the end of season for AEC Mons in January 2003. But he then loaned to Rapid București

Georgia
In April 2003, he returned to his homeland for Dinamo Tbilisi. But in summer 2003, he left for FC Tbilisi, another Georgian club.

Greece & Ukraine
In January 2004, he moved to Greece for Giannina, signed a two-year contract. But at the end of season, he moved, this time to Metalist Kharkiv, which is the longest club he played, from summer 2004 to winter 2007, except 2006/07 season spent on Arsenal Kiev.

In December 2007, he signed a two-year contract with Vorskla Poltava.

In late 2009 he was disqualified until March 2010 for testing positive for doping. He said that he drank wine laced with methadone to help with his depression caused by several of his relatives dying in a short period of time.

International career
A former U21 internationals, Jakobia received his first call-up on 18 August 2004 against Moldova. he also in the squad of Georgian side in UEFA Euro 2008 qualifying. He was call-up to the first match in August 2006, but just played three matches in the campaign in September and October 2007.

References

External links

 

1980 births
Living people
Footballers from Georgia (country)
Expatriate footballers from Georgia (country)
Georgia (country) international footballers
Association football forwards
FC Dinamo Tbilisi players
FC Metalist Kharkiv players
FC Arsenal Kyiv players
FC Vorskla Poltava players
RFC Liège players
Standard Liège players
R.A.E.C. Mons players
FC Rapid București players
PAS Giannina F.C. players
C.S. Visé players
FC Hoverla Uzhhorod players
Ukrainian Premier League players
Ukrainian First League players
Expatriate footballers in Belgium
Expatriate footballers in Greece
Expatriate footballers in Ukraine
Expatriate sportspeople from Georgia (country) in Ukraine
Expatriate footballers in Romania